The Jesse Whitesell House and Farm is a historic property in Fulton County, Kentucky, and Obion County, Tennessee. The house, which is located in Kentucky, was listed on the National Register of Historic Places in 1977. The associated farm was added to the National Register in 2009 as a historic district.

The house was built in 1868 for Jesse Whitesell, in the style of an Italianate villa.

As of 2005, the house was still owned and occupied by members of the Whitesell family.

References

Houses completed in 1871
Houses in Fulton County, Kentucky
Farms on the National Register of Historic Places in Tennessee
Houses on the National Register of Historic Places in Kentucky
Italianate architecture in Kentucky
Villas in the United States
Historic districts on the National Register of Historic Places in Kentucky
National Register of Historic Places in Obion County, Tennessee
Historic districts on the National Register of Historic Places in Tennessee
Farms on the National Register of Historic Places in Kentucky
National Register of Historic Places in Fulton County, Kentucky